The Special Capital Region of Jakarta in Indonesia is divided into 5 kota or municipalities and one kabupaten or regency, which in turn are divided administratively into districts, known as kecamatan. In total, there are 44 districts in Jakarta, a number that has remained since the most recent administrative change in 2001. South Jakarta and East Jakarta are tied with the largest number of districts with 10 each, while the Thousand Islands Regency has the least with just 2.

List

West Jakarta

Central Jakarta

South Jakarta

East Jakarta
 Cakung
 Cipayung
 Ciracas
 Duren Sawit
 Jatinegara
 Kramat Jati
 Makasar
 Matraman
 Menteng
 Pasar Rebo
 Pulo Gadung

North Jakarta
 Cilincing
 Kelapa Gading
 Koja
 Pademangan
 Penjaringan
 Tanjung Priok

Thousand Islands
 Kepulauan Seribu Selatan
 Kepulauan Seribu Utara

References

 
Jakarta
Districts